Walter Loro-Piana is a former Italian racing driver.

Complete results

References
 racingsportscars.com

Italian racing drivers
Mille Miglia drivers